Roxana Díaz Burgos (born February 20, 1972) is a Venezuelan television actress. She participated in Miss Venezuela 1992 and has worked in countless novels, series and movies.

Filmography

TV series

Movies
La Señora de Cárdenas (2003)

References

Roxana Díaz in VenCOR

1972 births
Living people
Actresses from Caracas
RCTV personalities
Venezuelan film actresses
Venezuelan television actresses